Margolin is a surname.

Margolin may also refer to:
 2561 Margolin, a main-belt asteroid 
 MCM pistol or Margolin, a Russian sport pistol
 Margolin Hebrew Academy, a co-educational Elementary School in East Memphis, Tennessee
 Morton Margolin Prize for Distinguished Business Reporting, an award for reporting in business journalism